The Bangladesh Davis Cup team represents Bangladesh in Davis Cup tennis competition and are governed by the Bangladesh Tennis Federation.

Bangladesh currently compete in the Asia/Oceania Zone of Group IV.

History
Bangladesh made its Davis Cup debut in 1986. They reached the semi-finals three years later in the 1989 Davis Cup held in Singapore. Bangladesh hosted the 1998 Davis Cup in Dhaka, where eight countries participated including Bangladesh, Bahrain, Iraq, Pacific Oceania, and Brunei. The Bangladesh team were runners-up in the group level. The youngest player to play in Davis Cup is from Bangladesh and his name is Mohammed-Akhtar Hossain. He was 13 years and 326 days when he played Myanmar in 2003. Bangladesh played in Asia/Oceania Zone Group III in the Davis Cup 2012. but was relegated to Group IV the following year. They have remained in this group since then.

Current team (2022) 

 Md Juel Rana
 Md Kawsar Ali
 Md Rubel Hossain
 Ranjan Ram

See also
Davis Cup

References

External links

Davis Cup teams
Davis Cup
Davis Cup